The 2020–21 Philadelphia 76ers season was the 72nd season of the franchise in the National Basketball Association (NBA). The 76ers replaced Brett Brown, with former Los Angeles Clippers coach Doc Rivers on October 3. In the shortened season (72 games instead of the normal 82) due to the ongoing COVID-19 pandemic, the 76ers finished the regular season at 49–23 which was first place in the Eastern Conference, one game ahead of the Brooklyn Nets. This was the first time since the 2000–01 club did so with a 56–26 record.

In the opening round of the playoffs, the Sixers defeated the Washington Wizards in five games. In the Conference Semifinals against the Atlanta Hawks, the 76ers would lose in seven games which included a squandered 26-point lead in Game 5.

Draft picks

Before the start of the 2020 NBA draft period, the 76ers' first-round selection (held by the Oklahoma City Thunder) was originally held stuck as the 22nd selection (while their own pick they traded to the Brooklyn Nets was held at #20) before the NBA suspended their season on March 12, 2020. However, with the 76ers resuming their prior season in the 2020 NBA Bubble, it left them chances to lose or gain ground for this draft period. Due to tiebreakers, the 76ers received the #21 pick from the Thunder, while the Nets gained the #19 pick. They also gained four second-round selections for this draft, including their own pick at #49, through trades involving the Atlanta Hawks, the New York Knicks, and the Orlando Magic via the Los Angeles Lakers.

Roster

 

}

Standings

Atlantic division

Conference standings 

Notes
 z – Clinched home court advantage for the entire playoffs
 c – Clinched home court advantage for the conference playoffs
 y – Clinched division title
 x – Clinched playoff spot
 pb – Clinched play-in spot
 o – Eliminated from playoff contention
 * – Division leader

Game log

Preseason

|- style="background:#cfc;"
| 1
| December 15
| Boston
|  
| Shake Milton (19)
| Tobias Harris (9)
| Ben Simmons (6)
| Wells Fargo Center0
| 1–0
|- style="background:#cfc;"
| 2
| December 18
| @ Indiana
|  
| Shake Milton (15)
| Tony Bradley (6)
| Ben Simmons (8)
| Bankers Life Fieldhouse0
| 2–0

Regular season

|- style="background:#cfc;"
| 1
| December 23
| Washington
| 
| Joel Embiid (29)
| Joel Embiid (14)
| Ben Simmons (7)
| Wells Fargo Center0
| 1–0
|- style="background:#cfc;"
| 2
| December 26
| @ New York
| 
| Joel Embiid (27)
| Joel Embiid (10)
| Ben Simmons (6)
| Madison Square Garden0
| 2–0
|- style="background:#fcc;"
| 3
| December 27
| @ Cleveland
| 
| Tobias Harris (16)
| Tobias Harris (9)
| Tobias Harris (5)
| Rocket Mortgage FieldHouse300
| 2–1
|- style="background:#cfc;"
| 4
| December 29
| Toronto
| 
| Joel Embiid (29)
| Joel Embiid (16)
| Ben Simmons (7)
| Wells Fargo Center0
| 3–1
|- style="background:#cfc;"
| 5
| December 31
| @ Orlando
|  
| Joel Embiid (21)
| Ben Simmons (10)
| Ben Simmons (8)
| Amway Center3,247
| 4–1

|- style="background:#cfc;"
| 6
| January 2
| Charlotte
|  
| Tobias Harris (24)
| Joel Embiid (14)
| Ben Simmons (11)
| Wells Fargo Center0
| 5–1
|- style="background:#cfc;"
| 7
| January 4
| Charlotte
|  
| Tobias Harris (22)
| Dwight Howard (13)
| Ben Simmons (6)
| Wells Fargo Center0
| 6–1
|- style="background:#cfc;"
| 8
| January 6
| Washington
|  
| Joel Embiid (38)
| Joel Embiid (8)
| Ben Simmons (12)
| Wells Fargo Center0
| 7–1
|- style="background:#fcc;"
| 9
| January 7
| @ Brooklyn
| 
| Shake Milton (24)
| Joel Embiid (12)
| Shake Milton (7)
| Barclays Center0
| 7–2
|- style="background:#fcc;"
| 10 
| January 9
| Denver
|  
| Tyrese Maxey (39)
| Tony Bradley (15)
| Tyrese Maxey (6)
| Wells Fargo Center0
| 7–3
|- style="background:#fcc;"
| 11
| January 11
| @ Atlanta
|  
| Joel Embiid (24)
| Joel Embiid (11)
| Isaiah Joe (4)
| State Farm Arena0
| 7–4
|- style="background:#cfc;"
| 12
| January 12
| Miami
|  
| Joel Embiid (45)
| Joel Embiid (16)
| Ben Simmons (12)
| Wells Fargo Center0
| 8–4
|- style="background:#cfc;"
| 13
| January 14
| Miami
|  
| Shake Milton (31)
| Ben Simmons (10)
| Ben Simmons (12)
| Wells Fargo Center0
| 9–4
|- style="background:#fcc;"
| 14
| January 16
| @ Memphis
|  
| Shake Milton (28)
| Dwight Howard (18)
| Ben Simmons (9)
| FedEx Forum206
| 9–5
|-
|-style="background:#ccc;"
| -
| January 17
| @ Oklahoma City 
| colspan="6" | Postponed (COVID-19) (Makeup date: April 10)
|- style="background:#cfc;"
| 15
| January 20
| Boston
|  
| Joel Embiid (42)
| Joel Embiid (10)
| Ben Simmons (8)
| Wells Fargo Center0
| 10–5
|- style="background:#cfc;"
| 16
| January 22
| Boston
|  
| Joel Embiid (38)
| Dwight Howard (12)
| Ben Simmons (11)
| Wells Fargo Center0
| 11–5
|- style="background:#cfc;"
| 17
| January 23
| @ Detroit
| 
| Joel Embiid (33)
| Joel Embiid (14)
| Ben Simmons (10)
| Little Caesars Arena0
| 12–5
|- style="background:#fcc;"
| 18
| January 25
| @ Detroit
| 
| Tobias Harris (25)
| Tony Bradley (9)
| Ben Simmons (4)
| Little Caesars Arena0
| 12–6
|- style="background:#cfc;"
| 19
| January 27
| L. A. Lakers
| 
| Joel Embiid (28)
| Ben Simmons (11)
| Ben Simmons (10) 
| Wells Fargo Center0
| 13–6
|- style="background:#cfc;"
| 20
| January 29
| @ Minnesota
|  
| Joel Embiid (37)
| Joel Embiid (11)
| Ben Simmons (7)
| Target Center0
| 14–6
|- style="background:#cfc;"
| 21
| January 31
| @ Indiana
|  
| Tobias Harris (27)
| Dwight Howard (15)
| Ben Simmons (7)
| Bankers Life Fieldhouse0
| 15–6

|- style="background:#cfc;"
| 22
| February 3
| @ Charlotte
| 
| Joel Embiid (34)
| Joel Embiid (11)
| Ben Simmons (9)
| Spectrum Center0
| 16–6
|- style="background:#fcc;"
| 23
| February 4
| Portland
| 
| Joel Embiid (34)
| Tobias Harris (11)
| Tobias Harris (5)
| Wells Fargo Center0
| 16–7
|- style="background:#cfc;"
| 24
| February 6
| Brooklyn
| 
| Joel Embiid (33)
| Tobias Harris (12)
| Ben Simmons (8)
| Wells Fargo Center0
| 17–7
|- style="background:#cfc;"
| 25
| February 9
| @ Sacramento
| 
| Joel Embiid (25)
| Joel Embiid (17)
| Ben Simmons (9)
| Golden 1 Center0
| 18–7
|- style="background:#fcc;"
| 26
| February 11
| @ Portland
| 
| Joel Embiid (35)
| Ben Simmons (11)
| Ben Simmons (9)
| Moda Center0
| 18–8
|- style="background:#fcc;"
| 27
| February 13
| @ Phoenix
| 
| Joel Embiid (25)
| Joel Embiid (17)
| Ben Simmons (9)
| Phoenix Suns Arena1,652
| 18–9
|- style="background:#fcc;"
| 28
| February 15
| @ Utah
| 
| Ben Simmons (42)
| Dwight Howard (12)
| Ben Simmons (12)
| Vivint Arena3.902
| 18–10
|- style="background:#cfc;"
| 29
| February 17
| Houston
| 
| Joel Embiid (31)
| Tobias Harris (15)
| Joel Embiid (9)
| Wells Fargo Center0
| 19–10
|- style="background:#cfc;"
| 30
| February 19
| Chicago
| 
| Joel Embiid (50)
| Joel Embiid (17)
| Tobias Harris (7)
| Wells Fargo Center0
| 20–10
|- style="background:#fcc;"
| 31
| February 21
| @ Toronto
| 
| Ben Simmons (28)
| Joel Embiid (17)
| Tobias Harris (7)
| Amalie Arena0
| 20–11
|- style="background:#cfc;"
| 32
| February 23
| @ Toronto
| 
| Tobias Harris (23)
| Joel Embiid (12)
| Ben Simmons (7)
| Amalie Arena0
| 21–11
|- style="background:#cfc;"
| 33
| February 25
| Dallas
|  
| Joel Embiid (23)
| Joel Embiid (9)
| Ben Simmons (7)
| Wells Fargo Center0
| 22–11
|- style="background:#fcc;"
| 34
| February 27
| Cleveland
|  
| Joel Embiid (42)
| Joel Embiid (13)
| Ben Simmons (8)
| Wells Fargo Center0
| 22–12

|- style="background:#cfc;"
| 35
| March 1
| Indiana
|  
| Shake Milton (26)
| Joel Embiid (13)
| Curry, Embiid, Maxey (5)
| Wells Fargo Center0
| 23–12
|- style="background:#cfc;"
| 36
| March 3
| Utah
| 
| Joel Embiid (40)
| Joel Embiid (19)
| Ben Simmons (6)
| Wells Fargo Center0
| 24–12
|- style="background:#cfc;"
| 37
| March 11
| @ Chicago
| 
| Tobias Harris (24)
| Dwight Howard (12)
| Seth Curry (7)
| United Center0
| 25–12
|- style="background:#cfc;"
| 38
| March 12
| @ Washington
| 
| Joel Embiid (23)
| Dwight Howard (10)
| Danny Green, Milton (4)
| Capital One Arena0
| 26–12
|- style="background:#cfc;"
| 39
| March 14
| San Antonio
| 
| Tobias Harris (23)
| Tobias Harris (9)
| Ben Simmons (9)
| Wells Fargo Center3,071
| 27–12
|- style="background:#cfc;"
| 40
| March 16
| New York
| 
| Tobias Harris (30)
| Ben Simmons (13)
| Ben Simmons (7)
| Wells Fargo Center3,071
| 28–12
|- style="background:#fcc;"
| 41
| March 17
| Milwaukee
| 
| Tobias Harris (19)
| Dwight Howard (15)
| Ben Simmons (12)
| Wells Fargo Center3,071
| 28–13
|- style="background:#cfc;"
| 42
| March 20
| Sacramento
| 
| Tobias Harris (29)
| Dwight Howard (13)
| Tobias Harris (8)
| Wells Fargo Center3,071
| 29–13
|- style="background:#cfc;"
| 43
| March 21
| @ New York
| 
| Shake Milton (21)
| Dwight Howard (13)
| Harris, Simmons (4)
| Madison Square Garden1,981
| 30–13
|- style="background:#cfc;"
| 44
| March 23
| @ Golden State
| 
| Tobias Harris (25)
| Harris, Howard (13)
| Harris, Milton, Simmons (4)
| Chase Center0
| 31–13
|- style="background:#cfc;"
| 45
| March 25
| @ L. A. Lakers
| 
| Danny Green (28)
| Simmons, Thybulle (7)
| Ben Simmons (12)
| Staples Center0
| 32–13
|- style="background:#fcc;"
| 46
| March 27
| @ L. A. Clippers
| 
| Tobias Harris (29)
| Dwight Howard (11)
| Tobias Harris (6)
| Staples Center0
| 32–14
|- style="background:#fcc;"
| 47
| March 30
| @ Denver
| 
| Tyrese Maxey (13)
| Howard, Scott (7)
| Shake Milton (4)
| Ball Arena3,574
| 32–15

|- style="background:#cfc;"
| 48
| April 1
| @ Cleveland
| 
| Shake Milton (27)
| Dwight Howard (15)
| Ben Simmons (5)
| Rocket Mortgage FieldHouse4,100
| 33–15
|- style="background:#cfc;"
| 49
| April 3
| Minnesota
| 
| Tobias Harris (32)
| Ben Simmons (8)
| Ben Simmons (6)
| Wells Fargo Center3,071
| 34–15
|- style="background:#fcc;"
| 50
| April 4
| Memphis
| 
| Tobias Harris (21)
| Dwight Howard (12)
| Ben Simmons (4)
| Wells Fargo Center4,094
| 34–16
|- style="background:#cfc;"
| 51
| April 6
| @ Boston
| 
| Joel Embiid (35)
| Dwight Howard (9)
| Ben Simmons (6)
| TD Garden2,298
| 35–16
|- style="background:#fcc;"
| 52
| April 9
| @ New Orleans
| 
| Tobias Harris (23)
| Embiid, Simmons (9)
| Ben Simmons (6)
| Smoothie King Center3,700
| 35–17
|- style="background:#cfc;"
| 53
| April 10
| @ Oklahoma City 
| 
| Joel Embiid (27)
| Dwight Howard (13)
| Seth Curry (6)
| Chesapeake Energy Arena0
| 36–17
|- style="background:#cfc;"
| 54
| April 12
| @ Dallas
| 
| Joel Embiid (36)
| Embiid, Howard (7)
| Ben Simmons (7)
| American Airlines Center4,016
| 37–17
|- style="background:#cfc;"
| 55
| April 14
| Brooklyn
| 
| Joel Embiid (39)
| Joel Embiid (13)
| Ben Simmons (9)
| Wells Fargo Center4,094
| 38–17
|- style="background:#cfc;"
| 56
| April 16
| L. A. Clippers
| 
| Joel Embiid (36)
| Joel Embiid (14)
| Ben Simmons (6)
| Wells Fargo Center4,094
| 39–17
|- style="background:#fcc;"
| 57
| April 19
| Golden State
| 
| Joel Embiid (28)
| Joel Embiid (13)
| Joel Embiid (8)
| Wells Fargo Center4,094
| 39–18
|- style="background:#fcc;"
| 58
| April 21
| Phoenix
| 
| Joel Embiid (38)
| Joel Embiid (17)
| Embiid, Green (4)
| Wells Fargo Center4,094
| 39–19
|- style="background:#fcc;"
| 59
| April 22
| @ Milwaukee
| 
| Joel Embiid (24)
| Dwight Howard (7)
| Tobias Harris (6)
| Fiserv Forum3,280
| 39–20
|- style="background:#fcc;"
| 60
| April 24
| @ Milwaukee
| 
| Maxey, Milton (15)
| Dwight Howard (12)
| Shake Milton (3)
| Fiserv Forum3,280
| 39–21
|- style="background:#cfc;"
| 61
| April 26
| Oklahoma City
| 
| Joel Embiid (21)
| Dwight Howard (11)
| Harris, Maxey, Simmons (4)
| Wells Fargo Center4,094
| 40–21
|- style="background:#cfc;"
| 62
| April 28
| Atlanta
| 
| Seth Curry (20)
| Embiid, Maxey (7)
| Harris, Milton, Simmons (6)
| Wells Fargo Center4,094
| 41–21
|- style="background:#cfc;"
| 63
| April 30
| Atlanta
| 
| Dwight Howard (19)
| Dwight Howard (11)
| Simmons, Thybulle (5)
| Wells Fargo Center4,094
| 42–21

|- style="background:#cfc;"
| 64
| May 2
| @ San Antonio
| 
| Joel Embiid (34)
| Joel Embiid (12)
| Harris, Simmons (5)
| AT&T Center3,978
| 43–21
|- style="background:#cfc;"
| 65
| May 3
| @ Chicago
| 
| Tobias Harris (21)
| Joel Embiid (10)
| Ben Simmons (5)
| United Center0
| 44–21
|- style="background:#cfc;"
| 66
| May 5
| @ Houston
| 
| Joel Embiid (34)
| Joel Embiid (12)
| Tyrese Maxey (7)
| Toyota Center3,583
| 45–21
|- style="background:#cfc;"
| 67
| May 7
| New Orleans
| 
| Joel Embiid (37)
| Joel Embiid (13)
| Ben Simmons (10)
| Wells Fargo Center5,119
| 46–21
|- style="background:#cfc;"
| 68
| May 8
| Detroit
| 
| Joel Embiid (29)
| Dwight Howard (14)
| Green, Harris, Maxey, Milton (4)
| Wells Fargo Center5,119
| 47–21
|- style="background:#fcc;"
| 69
| May 11
| @ Indiana
| 
| Tobias Harris (27)
| Ben Simmons (8)
| Ben Simmons (7)
| Bankers Life Fieldhouse0
| 47–22
|- style="background:#fcc;"
| 70
| May 13
| @ Miami
| 
| Tobias Harris (21)
| Dwight Howard (8)
| Ben Simmons (7)
| American Airlines Arena0
| 47–23
|- style="background:#cfc;"
| 71
| May 14
| Orlando
| 
| Seth Curry (20)
| Joel Embiid (11)
| Ben Simmons (9)
| Wells Fargo Center5,119
| 48–23
|- style="background:#cfc;"
| 72
| May 16
| Orlando
| 
| Tyrese Maxey (30)
| Paul Reed (12)
| Shake Milton (9)
| Wells Fargo Center5,119
| 49–23

Playoffs

|- style="background:#cfc;"
| 1
| May 23
| Washington
| 
| Tobias Harris (37)
| Ben Simmons (15)
| Ben Simmons (15)
| Wells Fargo Center11,160
| 1–0
|- style="background:#cfc;"
| 2
| May 26
| Washington
| 
| Embiid, Simmons (22)
| Dwight Howard (11)
| Ben Simmons (8)
| Wells Fargo Center11,160
| 2–0
|- style="background:#cfc;"
| 3
| May 29
| @ Washington
| 
| Joel Embiid (36)
| Tobias Harris (13)
| Ben Simmons (9)
| Capital One Arena10,665
| 3–0
|- style="background:#fcc;"
| 4
| May 31
| @ Washington
| 
| Tobias Harris (21)
| Tobias Harris (13)
| Tobias Harris (5)
| Capital One Arena10,665
| 3–1
|- style="background:#cfc;"
| 5
| June 2
| Washington
| 
| Seth Curry (30)
| Ben Simmons (10)
| Ben Simmons (11)
| Wells Fargo Center15,523
| 4–1

|- style="background:#fcc;"
| 1
| June 6
| Atlanta
| 
| Joel Embiid (39)
| Tobias Harris (10)
| Ben Simmons (10)
| Wells Fargo Center18,624
| 0–1
|- style="background:#cfc;"
| 2
| June 8
| Atlanta
| 
| Joel Embiid (40)
| Joel Embiid (13)
| Danny Green (8)
| Wells Fargo Center18,624
| 1–1
|- style="background:#cfc;"
| 3
| June 11
| @ Atlanta
| 
| Joel Embiid (27)
| Joel Embiid (9)
| Joel Embiid (8)
| State Farm Arena16,432
| 2–1
|- style="background:#fcc;"
| 4
| June 14
| @ Atlanta
| 
| Tobias Harris (20)
| Joel Embiid (21)
| Ben Simmons (9)
| State Farm Arena16,502
| 2–2
|- style="background:#fcc;"
| 5
| June 16
| Atlanta
| 
| Joel Embiid (37)
| Joel Embiid (13)
| Ben Simmons (9)
| Wells Fargo Center18,624
| 2–3
|- style="background:#cfc;"
| 6
| June 18
| @ Atlanta
| 
| Curry, Harris (24)
| Joel Embiid (13)
| Ben Simmons (5)
| State Farm Arena16,610
| 3–3
|- style="background:#fcc;"
| 7
| June 20
| Atlanta
| 
| Joel Embiid (31)
| Tobias Harris (14)
| Ben Simmons (13)
| Wells Fargo Center18,624
| 3–4

Transactions

Trades

Free agency

Re-signed

Additions

Subtractions

Awards

References

Philadelphia 76ers seasons
Philadelphia 76ers
Philadelphia 76ers
Philadelphia 76ers